Pedro Pablo Perlaza Caicedo (born 3 February 1991) is an Ecuadorian footballer who plays for S.D. Aucas.

Club career
He began his career with Juventus in 2009.

Career statistics

Honours
Aucas
Ecuadorian Serie A: 2022
Delfín
Ecuadorian Serie A: 2019
LDU Quito
Supercopa Ecuador: 2020, 2021

References

External links
 
 

1991 births
Living people
Association football midfielders
Ecuadorian footballers
Ecuadorian Serie A players
C.D. Quevedo footballers
C.S.D. Macará footballers
L.D.U. Portoviejo footballers
Delfín S.C. footballers
L.D.U. Quito footballers
Ecuador international footballers
Sportspeople from Esmeraldas, Ecuador